Silo is a 2019 American thriller drama film directed by Marshall Burnette and starring Jim Parrack, Jill Paice, Jack DiFalco, Jeremy Holm, Danny Ramirez and Chris Ellis. The film premiered at the 2019 Louisville's International Festival of Film.

Plot summary
The residents of a rural farming town have to put aside their differences to rescue Cody, a local teen, who is trapped in a 50-foot grain silo.

Cast
Jeremy Holm as Frank
Jill Paice as Valerie
Jack DiFalco as Cody
Jim Parrack as Junior
Chris Ellis as Mr. Adler
Danny Ramirez as Lucha
James DeForest Parker as Sutter
Rebecca Lines as Sheriff Jessica Baxter

Release
The film was released on May 7, 2021.

Reception
The film has a 65 percent rating on Rotten Tomatoes based on 20 reviews.

Glenn Kenny of RogerEbert.com awarded the film two stars and wrote, "The shooting is picturesque, the acting overbaked."

Jacob Oller of Paste rated the film a 4.1 and wrote, "There’s a very scary, thrilling, insightful movie to be made about these kinds of accidents and the people they happen to. Silo isn’t it."

Brian Shaer of Film Threat rated the film a 9.5 out of 10 and wrote, "But rest assured that soon enough, this small, unassuming film reveals its true nature as one of the scariest movies I’ve seen in a long time."

References

External links
 
 
 

2019 films
2019 thriller films
American thriller films
2010s English-language films
2010s American films